The Berezina or Biarezina is a river in Belarus and a right tributary of the Dnieper. The river starts in the Berezinsky Biosphere Reserve. The length of the Berezina is 613 km. The width of the river is 15-20 m, the maximum is 60 m. The banks are low (up to 0.5 m), steep in some areas (up to 1.5 m high), sandy, and the floodplain is swampy. Berezina freezes usually in the 1st half of December. 

The Berezina Biosphere Preserve by the river is on the UNESCO list of Biosphere Preserves. Peat bogs cover 430 km² and thus occupy an important part of the reserve. These open peat zones have remained virtually untouched and are among Europe's largest bogs. 

Cities and towns on the Berezina from north to south
 Dokshytsy 
 the village Studzionka
 Barysau
 Babruysk
 Svietlahorsk

Historical significance
Charles XII of Sweden's army crossed the Berezina on June 25, 1708, during his campaign against Peter the Great of Russia in the Great Northern War. (see  for details)
Napoleon Bonaparte's army suffered heavy losses (about 50,000) when they were crossing the Berezina in November, 1812, during the retreat from Russia (see Battle of Berezina). Since then "Berezina" is used in French as a synonym for catastrophe. See Charles Joseph Minard § The map of Napoleon's Russian campaign for a visual graphic of the army's fate
Several armies in German Wehrmacht Army Group Centre were entrapped and prevented from crossing the Berezina in June 1944, during the envelopment phases of the Bobruysk and Minsk Offensives, within the closing phases of Operation Bagration in World War II.  
There were military actions between Germany and Russia at the Berezina River in 1917–1918.
Several battles are named after the river.

References 

Rivers of Gomel Region
Rivers of Mogilev Region
Rivers of Minsk Region
Rivers of Vitebsk Region
Rivers of Belarus